Kaaliya Mardhanam is a 1982 Indian Malayalam-language crime thriller film directed and filmed by J. Williams, written by Pappanamkodu Lakshmanan and produced by Thiruppathi Chettiyar. Starring Shankar, Nedumudi Venu, Mohanlal, Sathyakala, Jose Prakash, Sankaradi and Lalu Alex. The film features music composed by K. J. Joy. The film was a huge success at the box office.

Plot 

Ramu, who is a taxi driver by profession loves his cousin Geetha. But Geetha is in love with Sreeni, who is the son of DSP Menon, who is her college mate. Johnny, Rahim, Swami and Kannan are spoilt brats of wealthy parents who are Geetha's and Sreeni's college mates.

Geetha's mother fixes her marriage with Ramu, which disturbs both Geetha and Sreeni. The mischievous gang offers help to the lovers to get them married with an ulterior motive. Believing the words of the pranksters, the lovers reach them and Geetha gets severely raped by the pranksters and dies.

The gang succeeds in accusing Ramu for the murder and gives evidence against him, which results in conviction with life imprisonment to Ramu. Ramu jumps from the prison to take revenge against the real culprits and one by one gets killed. DSP Menon suspects Ramu as the killer.

Three people are killed and Ramu at last reaches to the 4th one, Johnny, who is the son of a judge, but fails to kill him. Johnny follows Ramu and reaches a haunted place. On information, Menon arrives there and finds Johnny killed. But Menon is surprised to see the real killer of Johnny and the others was Sreeni , which leads to the stunning end of the film.

Cast 
Shankar as Ramu
Nedumudi Venu as Sreeni
Mohanlal as Johnny
Jose Prakash  as DSP Menon
Lalu Alex as Kannan
Murali as Rahim
Jagathy Sreekumar as Swami
Sathyakala as Geetha
Shivaji as Venus Raju, a photographer
Kaviyoor Ponnamma
Anuradha as Dancer
Anil Thomas as Kattupothu Chandhapan

Soundtrack 
The music was composed by K. J. Joy and the lyrics were written by Pappanamkodu Lakshmanan and Poovachal Khader.

References

External links 
 
 Watch on YouTube

1982 films
1980s Malayalam-language films